Sidney Magal, artistic name Sidney Magalhães (born 19 June 1950 in Rio de Janeiro), is a Brazilian singer, dancer and actor.

Discography 
Studio albums
 1977: Sidney Magal
 1978: Magal
 1979: O Amante
 1980: O Amor Não Tem Hora para Chegar
 1981: Quero Te Fazer Feliz
 1982: Magal Espetacular
 1983: Vibrações
 1984: Cara
 1985: Me Acende
 1987: Mãos Dadas
 1990: Magal
 1991: Só Satisfação
 1995: Sidney Magal & Big Band
 1998: Aventureiro
 2000: Baila Magal
 2006: Sidney Magal ao Vivo [CD/DVD]

Filmography

Films

Television

References

External links 
 
 Sidney Magal at Discogs

1953 births
Brazilian male film actors
Brazilian male television actors
Male actors from Rio de Janeiro (city)
Musicians from Rio de Janeiro (city)
Brazilian male dancers
Living people
20th-century Brazilian dancers
21st-century Brazilian dancers
20th-century Brazilian male actors
21st-century Brazilian male actors
20th-century Brazilian male singers
20th-century Brazilian singers
21st-century Brazilian male singers
21st-century Brazilian singers